The Pamitinan Protected Landscape is a Philippine protected area of approximately  in the Sierra Madre mountain range, just  northeast of Manila. It contains and protects the Montalban Gorge formed by the Marikina River that separates Mount Pamitinan and Mount Binacayan in the municipality of Rodriguez in Rizal. Established in 1996 through Proclamation No. 901 issued by President Fidel Ramos, the park is originally a component of the Mariquina Reserve founded in 1904 to protect the watershed of the Marikina River that supplied water to the city of Manila from the Wawa Dam located just above the Montalban Gorge in the early 1900s.

The park is visited for its scenic views, as well as for recreational activities as hiking, mountain climbing, spelunking and historical sightseeing. It includes the Pamitinan Cave which played a role during the Philippine Revolution and World War II, and is the setting of a popular local legend called Bernardo Carpio. The picturesque Montalban Gorge was declared a national monument and reserved area in 1983 by the National Committee on Geological Sciences of the Ministry of Natural Resources.

Geography

The Pamitinan Protected Landscape is situated in the sitio of Wawa within the jurisdiction of the barangay of San Rafael in the mountainous eastern section of Rodriguez, formerly the municipality of Montalban. The Montalban Gorge, also known as Wawa Gorge, has been a popular tourist destination since the Colonial Era and was widely regarded as one of the most remarkable natural features of Oriental scenery in the early 1900s.

Mounts Pamitinan and Binacayan are two limestone mountains formed around 20-25 million years ago during the Miocene epoch. They create a dramatic backdrop to the "Wawa" Dam, so named for its resemblance to a portal or "entrance" in the local Dumagat language. The karst topography of the mountains is due to the continuous passage of water along their cracks and fractures over millions of years. Mount Pamitinan, the 22nd tallest mountain in Rizal, is a popular hiking destination for beginners from Metro Manila. It has designated hiking trails consisting of a muddy and slippery assault part and a rock climbing bouldering trail. It requires only two hours to reach its summit from the sitio of Wawa. Its twin mountain to the south, Mount Binacayan, has a more agricultural terrain consisting of less explored rock and bamboo trails.

The Pamitinan Cave in Mount Pamitinan is a declared National Geological Monument. It is notable for its rich stalactites and stalagmites with rimstone pools and cave coral. The multichamber cave was used as a secret headquarters of the Katipunan where Andrés Bonifacio and his fellow revolutionaries first declared Philippine independence from Spain on April 12, 1895. It also figured during World War II when it was turned into an armory by the Japanese invading forces. Many Japanese were killed here during a three-month-long battle with American forces in 1945. It has the inscription Viva la Independencia written on its wall which dates back to the Philippine Revolution era. The cave is accessible via a hanging bridge from the Montalban gorge.

It was built in 1904 by the American colonial government and was the only source of water supply for Manila at the time until it was replaced by the Angat Dam in the 1960s. The artificial waterfall over the dam was turned into a tourist spot where cottages and shops selling locals' fruit and vegetable produce have also been developed. It is accessible via a  trek from the sitio of Wawa.

The mountain is the location of Mascap Spring. Another limestone cave known as Bat Cave which is only accessible during summer when the water level drops at Wawa Dam is also found within the protected area.

Biodiversity
The protected landscape park has rich flora and fauna owing to its location in the Sierra Madre range. It is a known birdwatching site that offers sightings of the endemic scale-feathered malkoha, grey-backed tailorbird, elegant tit, grey-rumped swiftlet, white-browed shama, crested honey buzzard, Philippine bulbul, feral pigeon, peregrine falcon and mangrove blue flycatcher.

The park's vegetation resembles that of the adjacent Upper Marikina River Basin Protected Landscape and comprises dipterocarp species characteristic of lowland forests such as tanguile, mayapis, bagtikan, white lauan and red lauan.

References

Protected landscapes of the Philippines
Geography of Rizal
Tourist attractions in Rizal
Birdwatching sites in the Philippines
Protected areas of the Sierra Madre (Philippines)
Protected areas established in 1996
1996 establishments in the Philippines
Rodriguez, Rizal